Chris Davies (born 16 January 1980) is a New Zealand former cricketer. He played two first-class matches for Otago in 1998/99.

See also
 List of Otago representative cricketers

References

External links
 

1980 births
Living people
New Zealand cricketers
Otago cricketers
Cricketers from Nelson, New Zealand